Follow Your Footsteps is the second album released in 1986, and thirteenth overall, by avant- folk/ blues singer-songwriter Jandek. The album was released as Corwood Industries  0751.

Track listing 

Jandek albums
Corwood Industries albums
1986 albums